Cosmic X-ray Background Nanosatellite (CXBN) was a satellite and mission developed by the Morehead State University. Unlike its successor, it was a partial failure as its transmissions were too weak for its mission due to it going into an anomalous low power mode. It was supposed to take measurements of the cosmic X-ray background in the 30-50 keV range and temporarily supplement NASA's Radiation Belt Storm Probes.

Objectives 
CXBN was created as a low-cost CubeSat platform to observe the extragalactic cosmic X-ray background and take improved measurements. It had a new gamma ray detector system with its CZT array, which would have potentially provided insight into the early universe's physics.

Design 
The CXBN CubeSat occupied a volume of  when in its compact form. It had four deployable solar panels. Morehead State University (MSU) engineered its subsystems, while the CZT detector was designed by the University of California at Berkeley and Lawrence Livermore National Laboratory. It also contained Sun sensors for its spin stabilization.

Instruments 
CXBN contained a Cadmium Zinc Telluride array to allow for the mapping of the cosmic X-ray background.

Launch and mission 
CXBN was launched on   along with several other nanosatellites as part of NASA's Educational Launch of Nanosatellites program on an Atlas V 401 rocket. It was also the 35th launch of the NROL program with a main satellite payload for the National Reconnaissance Office.

MSU provided support for ground operations with its 21m Space Tracking Antenna.

It did not complete its science mission due to an anomaly causing it to go to low power mode. The signal-to-noise ratio was too low, preventing the ground station from collecting enough data.

Notes

References 

2012 in spaceflight
CubeSats
Morehead State University